The West railway between the capital Vienna and Salzburg is being upgraded.

The section between Attnang-Puchheim and Salzburg has not been part of the massive investments during the past decades. Therefore a new high-speed rail line between Köstendorf and Salzburg is being planned by ÖBB. This new infrastructure should enable to substantially increase the number of regional trains on the existing tracks and cut travel times for long distance connections by using the new tunnels. Construction works are expected to begin in 2025/2026.

The expected year of completion is 2032. The section is also part of the Berlin-Palermo railway axis. 

The Koralmbahn, the first entirely new railway line in the Second Austrian Republic has been under construction since 2006. It includes a new  tunnel (the Koralmtunnel) connecting the cities of Klagenfurt and Graz. The travel time between Klagenfurt and Graz will be reduced from three hours to one hour. The Koralmbahn is expected to be operational by 2025. Another important project on the Southern Railway is the Semmering Base Tunnel. The new tunnel connects the states of Lower Austria and Styria and allows massive travel time reductions compared to the existing Semmering railway. The new base tunnel will become operational in 2028.

Network

See also
 High-speed rail in Europe
 High-speed rail in Switzerland
 High-speed rail in Germany
 High-speed rail in Italy
 Rail transport in Austria

References

High-speed rail in Austria